Metaparaclius is a genus of flies in the family Dolichopodidae. It is known from Papua New Guinea and Australia. The systematic position and monophyly of the genus are currently ambiguous: the holotype specimen of the type species, Metaparaclius subapicalis, was deposited in the Hungarian Natural History Museum, which was destroyed during the Hungarian Revolution of 1956, and no other specimens of this species are currently known.

Species
Metaparaclius australiensis Parent, 1941 – northern Australia
Metaparaclius subapicalis Becker, 1922 – New Guinea

References

Dolichopodinae
Dolichopodidae genera
Diptera of Australasia
Taxa named by Theodor Becker